Alonzo Jermey Russell (born September 29, 1992) is an American football wide receiver for the Ottawa Redblacks of the Canadian Football League (CFL). He played college football at the University of Toledo and signed with the Cincinnati Bengals as an undrafted free agent in 2016. He has been a member of the Cincinnati Bengals, Arizona Cardinals and New York Giants of the National Football League (NFL), and Winnipeg Blue Bombers of the Canadian Football League (CFL).

Professional career

Cincinnati Bengals
Russell signed with the Cincinnati Bengals after going undrafted in the 2016 NFL Draft. On September 3, 2016, he was waived by the Bengals and was signed to the practice squad the next day. After spending the entire season on the practice squad, Russell signed a futures contract with the Bengals on January 2, 2017.

On September 2, 2017, Russell was waived by the Bengals.

Arizona Cardinals
On November 22, 2017, Russell was signed to the Arizona Cardinals' practice squad.

New York Giants
On May 14, 2018, Russell signed with the New York Giants. He was waived on September 1, 2018 and was signed to the practice squad the next day. He was promoted to the active roster on December 29, 2018.

On September 1, 2019, Russell was waived by the Giants.

St. Louis BattleHawks
Russell was selected in the 9th round (70th overall) of the first phase by the St. Louis BattleHawks in the 2020 XFL Draft. He had his contract terminated when the league suspended operations on April 10, 2020.

Winnipeg Blue Bombers
Russell signed with the Winnipeg Blue Bombers of the CFL on July 3, 2020. He was released on July 19, 2021.

References

External links
Toledo Rockets bio

1992 births
Living people
Players of American football from Washington, D.C.
American football wide receivers
Toledo Rockets football players
Cincinnati Bengals players
Arizona Cardinals players
New York Giants players
St. Louis BattleHawks players
H. D. Woodson High School alumni
Winnipeg Blue Bombers players